This is a list of listed buildings in Samsø Municipality, Denmark.

Listed buildings

References

External links

 Danish Agency of Culture

 
Samsø